The Funks Shale is a geologic formation in the Sacramento Valley of northern California.

It is found in the Sutter Buttes area of Sutter County, California.

It preserves fossils dating back to the Cretaceous period.

See also

 
 List of fossiliferous stratigraphic units in California
 Paleontology in California

References
 
 Google Books: The Sutter Buttes of California: A Study of Plio-Pleistocene Volcanism; Howel Williams, Garniss H. Curtis.

Cretaceous California
Geology of Sutter County, California
Shale formations of the United States
Geologic formations of California